The Moriori genocide was the mass murder and enslavement of the Moriori people, the indigenous ethnic group of the Chatham Islands, by members of the mainland New Zealand iwi Ngāti Mutunga and Ngāti Tama from 1835 to the early 1860s. The invaders murdered around 300 Moriori and enslaved the remaining population, causing the population to drop from 1,700 in 1835 to only 100 in 1870.

Background

Moriori 
The Moriori are the indigenous population of the Chatham Islands (Moriori: Rēkohu), specifically Chatham Island and Pitt Island. Moriori share the same Polynesian ancestry as Māori people. According to oral tradition the first Moriori came to New Zealand from Eastern Polynesia around 1500, a couple hundred years after Māori first arrived on the mainland, and formed their own unique culture adapted to their isolated island environment and its marine resources. Later migration came from mainland New Zealand. The Moriori population peaked at around 2,000 divided among nine tribes.

After bloody inter-tribal conflict on the islands, high-ranking Moriori chief Nunuku-whenua introduced a philosophy of non-violence in the 16th century, known as Nunuku's Law. This law became engrained in Moriori culture.

In November 1791, British ship the Chatham was blown off course and landed at what they named Chatham Island. In a misunderstanding with the ship's crew, Moriori man Tamakaroro was shot dead. Moriori elders believed Tamakaroro was partly at fault for the shooting and planned appropriate visitor greeting rituals.

Invaders 
The two invading Māori tribes were originally from Taranaki. They had lost their land during the Musket Wars against other iwi and had developed a diaspora around the Wellington harbour.

Invasion 

In 1835, with the forced assistance of Pākehā mariners, around 900 Māori people from Ngāti Mutunga and Ngāti Tama sailed to the Chatham Islands. They then were welcomed to the islands by the Moriori and enjoyed their hospitality. This group arrived in two waves. The first arrived on 19 November 1835 via the hijacked European ship Lord Rodney and carried 500 people along with guns, clubs and axes. This first group killed and hung up a 12-year-old Moriori girl. The second group arrived on 5 December 1835. With the arrival of the second group "parties of warriors armed with muskets, clubs and tomahawks, led by their chiefs, walked through Moriori tribal territories" and "curtly informed the inhabitants that their land had been taken and the Moriori living there were now vassals."

Due to the new arrivals' hostility, a hui (council) of 1,000 Moriori was convened at settlement called Te Awapatiki to debate possible responses. Younger members argued that the Moriori could fight back as they outnumbered Māori two-to-one. Elders, however, argued Nunuku's Law should not be broken. Despite knowing Māori were not pacifist, Moriori ultimately decided to stay pacifist against the invaders, describing Nunuku's Law as "a moral imperative".

Although the council decided in favour of peace, the invading Māori inferred that the decision was a prelude to war. Violence erupted and around 300 Moriori were killed, with hundreds more enslaved. The invaders killed around 10% of the population in a ritual that included staking out women and children on the beach and leaving them to die in great pain over several days.

During the period of enslavement the Māori invaders forbade the speaking of the Moriori language. They forced Moriori to desecrate sacred sites by urinating and defecating on them. Moriori were forbidden to marry Moriori or Māori or to have children. This was different from the customary form of slavery practised on mainland New Zealand.

A total of 1,561 Moriori died between the invasion in 1835 and the release of Moriori from slavery in 1863, and in 1862 only 101 Moriori remained. Causes of death include murder but also introduced Western diseases.

Government dealings 

Moriori petitioned the Government from the 1850s for recognition of their status as the indigenous population of the islands and for restoration of their lands.

The release of Moriori from slavery in 1863 occurred via a proclamation by the resident magistrate of the Chatham Islands.

In 1870, a Native Land Court was established to adjudicate competing land claims; by this time most Māori had returned to Taranaki. The court ruled in favour of the Māori, awarding them 97% of the land. The judge ruled that since the Moriori had been conquered by Māori they did not have ownership rights of the land.

In modern times 
The last Moriori of unmixed ancestry, Tommy Solomon, died in 1933, though there remain just under a thousand people who identify as Moriori.

Moriori culture underwent a revival beginning with a 1980 documentary, which corrected lingering myths about Moriori. These myths include the claim that Moriori were extinct and that Moriori inhabited mainland New Zealand before Māori.

In 1994, Waitangi Tribunal hearings began on the recognition of Moriori as the original inhabitants of the Chatham Islands and compensation. Released in 2001 the tribunal sided with Moriori. In 2020 a treaty settlement requesting a correcting of history, a transfer of significant land to Moriori, and millions of dollars in compensation passed in Parliament.

The first Moriori marae on Chatham Island opened in January 2005, with the opening attended by Prime Minister Helen Clark.

References

Bibliography 
 

1835 in New Zealand
Genocides in Oceania-Pacific
History of the Chatham Islands
Moriori
Musket Wars
Māori intertribal wars